Gloria Jean Watkins (September 25, 1952December 15, 2021), better known by her pen name bell hooks, was an American author, theorist, educator, and social critic who was a Distinguished Professor in Residence at Berea College. She is best known for her writings on race, feminism, and class. The focus of hooks' writing was to explore the intersectionality of race, capitalism, and gender, and what she described as their ability to produce and perpetuate systems of oppression and class domination. She published around 40 books, including works that ranged from essays, poetry, and children's books. She published numerous scholarly articles, appeared in documentary films, and participated in public lectures. Her work addressed love, race, class, gender, art, history, sexuality, mass media, and feminism.

She began her academic career in 1976 teaching English and ethnic studies at the University of Southern California. She later taught at several institutions including Stanford University, Yale University, and The City College of New York, before joining Berea College in Berea, Kentucky, in 2004. In 2014, hooks also founded the bell hooks Institute at Berea College. Her pen name was borrowed from her maternal great-grandmother, Bell Blair Hooks.

On December 15, 2021 bell hooks died from kidney failure at her home in Berea, Kentucky, aged 69.

Early life
Gloria Jean Watkins was born on September 25, 1952 to a working-class African-American family, in Hopkinsville, a small, segregated town in Kentucky. Watkins was one of six children born to Rosa Bell Watkins (née Oldham) and Veodis Watkins. Her father worked as a janitor and her mother worked as a maid in the homes of white families. In her memoir Bone Black: Memories of Girlhood (1996), Watkins would write of her "struggle to create self and identity" while growing up in "a rich magical world of southern black culture that was sometimes paradisiacal and at other times terrifying."

An avid reader (with poets William Wordsworth, Langston Hughes, Elizabeth Barrett Browning and Gwendolyn Brooks among her favorites), Watkins was educated in racially segregated public schools, later moving to an integrated school in the late 1960s. This experience greatly influenced her perspective as an educator, and it inspired scholarship on education practices as seen in her book, Teaching to Transgress: Education as the Practice of Freedom. She graduated from Hopkinsville High School before obtaining her BA in English from Stanford University in 1973, and her MA in English from the University of Wisconsin–Madison in 1976. During this time, Watkins was writing her book Ain't I a Woman: Black Women and Feminism, which she began at the age of 19 and then published in 1981.

In 1983, after several years of teaching and writing, she completed her doctorate in English at the University of California, Santa Cruz, with a dissertation on author Toni Morrison entitled "Keeping a Hold on Life: Reading Toni Morrison's Fiction."

Influences 
Included among hooks' influences is the American abolitionist and feminist, Sojourner Truth. Truth's Ain't I a Woman? inspired hooks' first major book. Also, the Brazilian educator, Paulo Freire, is mentioned in hooks' book, Teaching to Transgress. His perspectives on education are present in the first chapter, "engaged pedagogy."  Other influences include Peruvian theologian, Gustavo Gutiérrez, psychologist, Erich Fromm, playwright, Lorraine Hansberry, Buddhist monk, Thích Nhất Hạnh, and African American writer, James Baldwin.

Teaching and writing
She began her academic career in 1976 as an English professor and senior lecturer in ethnic studies at the University of Southern California. During her three years there, Golemics, a Los Angeles publisher, released her first published work, a chapbook of poems titled And There We Wept (1978), written under the name "bell hooks." She had adopted her maternal great-grandmother's name as her pen name because, as she later put it, her great-grandmother "was known for her snappy and bold tongue, which [she] greatly admired." She also said she put the name in lowercase letters both to honor her great-grandmother and to convey that what is most important to focus upon is her works, not her personal qualities: the "substance of books, not who [she is]." On the unconventional lowercasing of her pen name, hooks added that, "When the feminist movement was at its zenith in the late '60s and early '70s, there was a lot of moving away from the idea of the person. It was: Let's talk about the ideas behind the work, and the people matter less... It was kind of a gimmicky thing, but lots of feminist women were doing it."

In the early 1980s and 1990s, hooks taught at several post-secondary institutions, including the University of California, Santa Cruz, San Francisco State University, Yale (1985 to 1988, as assistant professor of African and Afro-American studies and English), Oberlin College (1988 to 1994, as associate professor of American literature and women's studies), and, beginning in 1994, as distinguished professor of English at City College of New York.

South End Press published her first major work, Ain't I a Woman? Black Women and Feminism, in 1981, though she had written it years earlier while still an undergraduate. In the decades since its publication, Ain't I a Woman? has been recognized for its contribution to feminist thought, with Publishers Weekly in 1992 naming it "One of the twenty most influential women's books in the last 20 years." Writing in The New York Times in 2019, Min Jin Lee said that Ain't I a Woman "remains a radical and relevant work of political theory. She lays the groundwork of her feminist theory by giving historical evidence of the specific sexism that black female slaves endured and how that legacy affects black womanhood today." Ain't I a Woman? examines themes including the historical impact of sexism and racism on black women, devaluation of black womanhood, media roles and portrayal, the education system, the idea of a white-supremacist-capitalist-patriarchy and the marginalization of black women.

At the same time, hooks became significant as a leftist and postmodern political thinker and cultural critic. She published more than 30 books, ranging in topics from black men, patriarchy, and masculinity to self-help; engaged pedagogy to personal memoirs; and sexuality (in regards to feminism and politics of aesthetics and visual culture). Reel to Real: race, sex, and class at the movies (1996) collects film essays, reviews, and interviews with film directors. In The New Yorker, Hua Hsu said these interviews displayed the facet of hooks' work that was "curious, empathetic, searching for comrades."

In Feminist Theory: From Margin to Center (1984), hooks develops a critique of white feminist racism in second-wave feminism, which she argued undermined the possibility of feminist solidarity across racial lines.

As hooks argued, communication and literacy (the ability to read, write, and think critically) are necessary for the feminist movement because without them people may not grow to recognize gender inequalities in society.

In Teaching to Transgress (1994), hooks' attempts a new approach to education for minority students. Particularly, hooks' strives to make scholarship on theory accessible to "be read and understood across different class boundaries.”

In 2002, hooks gave a commencement speech at Southwestern University. Eschewing the congratulatory mode of traditional commencement speeches, she spoke against what she saw as government-sanctioned violence and oppression, and admonished students who she believed went along with such practices. The Austin Chronicle reported that many in the audience booed the speech, though "several graduates passed over the provost to shake her hand or give her a hug."

In 2004, she joined Berea College as Distinguished Professor in Residence. Her 2008 book, belonging: a culture of place, includes an interview with author Wendell Berry as well as a discussion of her move back to Kentucky. She was a scholar in residence at The New School on three occasions, the last time in 2014. Also in 2014, the bell hooks Institute was founded at Berea College, where she donated her papers in 2017.

During her time at Berea College, hooks also founded the bell hooks center along with professor Dr. M. Shadee Malaklou. The center was established to provide underrepresented students, especially black and brown, femme, queer, and Appalachian individuals at Berea College, a safe space where they can develop their activist expression, education, and work. bell hooks’ work and her emphasis on the importance of feminism and love serves as the inspiration and guiding principles of the center and the education it offers. The center continues to operate today and offers events and programming with an emphasis on radical feminist and anti-racist thought.

She was inducted into the Kentucky Writers Hall of Fame in 2018.

In 2020, during the George Floyd protests, there was a resurgence of hooks' work on racism, feminism, and capitalism. Her pioneering work remains relevant in the political and social climate of the United States.

Personal life

Regarding her sexual identity, hooks described herself as "queer-pas-gay." She used the term "pas" from the French language, translating to "not" in the English language. hooks describes being queer in her own words as "not who you're having sex with, but about being at odds with everything around it."  She states, "As the essence of queer, I think of Tim Dean's work on being queer and queer not as being about who you're having sex with – that can be a dimension of it – but queer as being about the self that is at odds with everything around it and it has to invent and create and find a place to speak and to thrive and to live." During an interview with Abigail Bereola in 2017, hooks revealed to Bereola that she was single while they discussed her love life. During the interview, hooks told Bereola, "I don't have a partner. I've been celibate for 17 years. I would love to have a partner, but I don't think my life is less meaningful."

Buddhism 
Through her interest in Beat poetry and after an encounter with the poet and Buddhist Gary Snyder, hooks was first introduced to Buddhism in her early college years. She described herself as finding Buddhism as part of a personal journey in her youth, centered on seeking to recenter love and spirituality in her life and configure these concepts into her focus on activism and justice. After her initial exposures to Buddhism, hooks incorporated it into her Christian upbringing and this combined Christian-Buddhist thought influenced her identity, activism, and writing for the remainder of her life.

She was drawn to Buddhism because of the personal and academic framework it offered her to understand and respond to suffering and discrimination as well as love and connection. She describes the Christian-Buddhist focus on everyday practice as fulfilling the centering and grounding needs of her everyday life.

Buddhist thought, especially the work of Thích Nhất Hạnh, appears in multiple of hooks' essays, books, and poetry. Buddhist spirituality also played an significant role in the creation of   love ethic which became a major focus in both her written work and her activism.

Films
 Black Is... Black Ain't (1994)
 Give a Damn Again (1995)
 Cultural Criticism and Transformation (1997)
 My Feminism (1997)
 Voices of Power (1999)
 BaadAsssss Cinema (2002)
 I Am a Man: Black Masculinity in America (2004)

 Happy to Be Nappy and Other Stories of Me (2004)
 Is Feminism Dead? (2004)
 Fierce Light: When Spirit Meets Action (2008)
 Occupy Love (2012)
 Hillbilly (2018)

Awards and nominations
 Yearning: Race, Gender, and Cultural Politics: The American Book Awards/ Before Columbus Foundation Award (1991)
 bell hooks: The Writer's Award from the Lila Wallace–Reader's Digest Fund (1994)
 Happy to Be Nappy: NAACP Image Award nominee (2001)
 Homemade Love: The Bank Street College Children's Book of the Year (2002)
 Salvation: Black People and Love: Hurston/Wright Legacy Award nominee (2002)
 bell hooks: Utne Readers "100 Visionaries Who Could Change Your Life"
 bell hooks: The Atlantic Monthlys "One of our nation's leading public intellectuals"
 bell hooks: TIME 100 Women of the Year, 2020

Writing Works

Adult Books

 
 
 
  Excerpted in 
 
 With Cornel West, 
 
 
 
 
 
 
 
 
 
 
 
 
 
 
 
 
 
 
 
 
 
 With Amalia Mesa-Bains, 
 
 
 
 
 With Stuart Hall, Uncut Funk: A Contemplative Dialogue, Foreword by Paul Gilroy. New York, NY: Routledge. 2018. .

Children's books

Book Sections
 
 
 
  Pdf.

References

Citations

Cited sources

Further readings

 
 
 Leitch et al., eds. "bell hooks". The Norton Anthology of Theory and Criticism. New York: W. W. Norton & Company, 2001. pp. 2475–2484.

External links

 bell hooks articles published in Lion's Roar magazine.
 South End Press (books by hooks published by South End Press)
 University of California, Santa Barbara (biographical sketch of hooks)
 "Postmodern Blackness" (article by hooks)
 Whole Terrain (articles by hooks published in Whole Terrain)
 Challenging Capitalism & Patriarchy (interviews with hooks by Third World Viewpoint)
 Ingredients of Love (an interview with Ascent magazine)
 
 
 In Depth interview with hooks, May 5, 2002
 Lawrence Chua, "bell hooks" (interview), BOMB magazine, July 1, 1994
 "bell hooks remembered: 'She embodied everything I wanted to be'", The Guardian, December 16, 2021.
 "For bell hooks", Media Diversified, December 16, 2021.
 "Remembering bell hooks & Her Critique of 'Imperialist White Supremacist Heteropatriarchy. Democracy Now!
 "bell hooks - Are You Still a Slave? Liberating the Black Female Body | Eugene Lang College", The New School (via YouTube), May 6, 2014.

 
1952 births
2021 deaths
Deaths from kidney failure
History of women in the United States
People from Berea, Kentucky
People from Hopkinsville, Kentucky

20th-century African-American writers
20th-century American essayists
20th-century American philosophers
20th-century American poets
20th-century American women writers
20th-century pseudonymous writers
21st-century African-American writers
21st-century American essayists
21st-century American philosophers
21st-century American poets
21st-century American women writers
21st-century pseudonymous writers
African-American children's writers
African-American memoirists
African-American philosophers
African-American poets
Black studies scholars
American children's writers
American ethicists
American memoirists
American philosophy academics
American social commentators
American women essayists
American women memoirists
American women non-fiction writers
American women philosophers
American women poets
Analytic philosophers
Communication theorists
Critical race theory
Critical theorists
Film theorists
LGBT philosophers
Literacy and society theorists
Mass media theorists
Philosophers of art
Philosophers of culture
Philosophers of education
Philosophers of history
Philosophers of literature
Philosophers of sexuality
Philosophers of social science
Philosophy writers
Political philosophers
Postmodern writers
Poststructuralists
Pseudonymous women writers
Social philosophers
Theorists on Western civilization
Trope theorists
Writers about activism and social change
Writers about globalization

African-American feminists
American feminist writers
American socialist feminists
Feminist studies scholars
Feminist theorists
Postmodern feminists
Radical feminism

American anti-capitalists
American human rights activists
American social activists
American socialists
American anti-poverty advocates
Free speech activists

City University of New York faculty
San Francisco State University faculty
University of Southern California faculty
Yale University faculty

Academics from Kentucky
American Book Award winners
Appalachian writers
Kentucky women writers
LGBT African Americans
LGBT people from Kentucky
Queer women
Queer writers
Stanford University alumni
University of California, Santa Cruz alumni
University of Wisconsin–Madison College of Letters and Science alumni
Oberlin College faculty
Writers from Kentucky
20th-century African-American women writers
21st-century African-American women writers
Philosophers from Kentucky